Metrernis tencatei is a species of moth of the family Tortricidae. It is found on Ternate Island in eastern Indonesia.

References

Moths described in 1957
Chlidanotini